OPS-20 is a two-dimensional radar manufactured by Japan Radio. It is compatible with the Global Maritime Distress and Safety System (GMDSS) and installed as an anti-water search radar on the Maritime Self-Defense Force's escort ship. Variations include OPS-20B, OPS-20C and OPS-20E.

The model numbers of the Maritime Self-Defense Force's electronic devices, including this machine, are generally based on the naming rules for military electronic devices of the U.S. military. It is for radar mounted on surface vessels, for detection / distance direction measurement / search.

Overview 
In addition, the OPS-20C is adopted by the Hyūga-class helicopter destroyer and Akizuki-class destroyer has been developed as an anti-water search radar, and is composed of two antennas, a main and a sub. Also, by changing the radar wave used from pulse wave to unmodulated continuous wave (CW), the discoverability is reduced.

On board ships 

 Abukuma-class destroyer escort (JS Tone) 
Kongo-class destroyer 
Murasame-class destroyer 
Takanami-class destroyer 
Atago-class destroyer 
Hyūga-class helicopter destroyer 
Akizuki-class destroyer 
Izumo-class helicopter destroyer 
Ōsumi-class tank landing ship 
Uraga-class mine countermeasure vessel 
Hayabusa-class patrol boat  
JS Kashima 
JS Chihaya 
Towada-class replenishment ship  
Mashū-class replenishment ship 
JS Nichinan 
JS Tenryū

Gallery

Citations

References 

 Norman Friedman (2006). The Naval Institute Guide to World Naval Weapon Systems.  Naval Institute Press.  ISBN 9781557502629
 Self-Defense Force Equipment Yearbook 2006-2007. Asaun News Agency. ISBN 4-7509-1027-9

Naval radars
Military radars of Japan
Military equipment introduced in the 1960s